Mladen Mihajlović (born January 11, 1985) is a Serbian strength and conditioning coach and former basketball player.

Early life 
Mihajlović started his basketball career playing with the youth teams of Torlak and OKK Beograd. Later he moved to the junior team of Partizan. He earned his bachelor's degree in sport sciences from the University of Belgrade in 2011.

Coaching career 
Mihajlović was a strength and conditioning coach for the Spartak Moscow women's youth team (Russia) and the Târgoviște women's team (Romania), as well as for the domestic teams Crvena zvezda and Radnički Kragujevac.

In January 2016, he joined the Partizan coaching staff while Aleksandar Džikić was a head coach. After Serbian coach Aleksandar Đorđević had become the head coach for the Bayern Munich, Mihajlović joined their coaching staff as a strength and conditioning coach.

On March 11, 2019, Mihajlović joined a coaching staff of Virtus Bologna when Đorđević signed as their head coach.

On August 23, 2021, he has signed with Fenerbahçe Beko of the Basketball Super League.

National teams coaching 
From 2012 to 2014, Mihajlović was a member of the coaching staff for the youth national selections of Serbia led by head coach Dejan Mijatović. In 2012, he worked with under-18 team, in 2013 with under-19 team and during 2014 he worked with Serbia under-20 team.

In summer 2014, Mihajlović became a strength and conditioning coach for Serbia men's senior national team. He was a member of coaching staff at the 2014 FIBA Basketball World Cup, FIBA EuroBasket 2015, 2016 Summer Olympics, FIBA EuroBasket 2017 and the 2019 FIBA Basketball World Cup.

Career achievements
 Basketball Super League (Turkey) champion: 1 (with Fenerbahçe Beko: 2021–22)
 FIBA Champions League champion: 1 (with Segafredo Virtus Bologna: 2018–19)
 Italian League champion: 1 (with Segafredo Virtus Bologna: 2020–21)
 Romanian Women's League champion: 1 (with CSM Târgoviște: 2011–12)
 German Cup winner: 1 (with FC Bayern Munich: 2017–18)
 Romanian Women's Cup winner: 1 (with CSM Târgoviște: 2011–12)

References

External links 
 

1985 births
Living people
KK Crvena zvezda assistant coaches
Serbian men's basketball coaches
Serbian expatriate basketball people in Germany
Serbian expatriate basketball people in Italy
Serbian expatriate basketball people in Romania
Serbian expatriate basketball people in Russia
Serbian expatriate basketball people in Turkey
Serbian men's basketball players
Serbian strength and conditioning coaches
Sportspeople from Kruševac
University of Belgrade Faculty of Sport and Physical Education alumni